Sörup is a municipality in the district of Schleswig-Flensburg, in Schleswig-Holstein, Germany. It is situated approximately 23 km northeast of Schleswig, and 17 km southeast of Flensburg.

References

Schleswig-Flensburg